John Lassam Swann (3 October 1926 – 4 July 2011) was an English cricketer and footballer.

External links
 CricketArchive
 ESPN Cricinfo

1926 births
2011 deaths
English cricketers
Middlesex cricketers
English footballers
People from Ealing
Association footballers not categorized by position